Île Altazin is one of the Kerguelen Islands near the coast of Grande Terre, the principal island.

It lies in the Swains Bay between the south-eastern part of the Gallieni Peninsula and the west coast of the Joan of Arc Peninsula, around 1 km NW of the Gaby Island.

The highest point of the island is an unnamed hill that reaches the elevation of 292 m above the sea level.

References
 Kerguelen islands map, Géoportail IGN.
 General view of non-metropolitan France, Maison de la Géographie.

Altazin